Attila Simon (born 23 September 1988 in Salgótarján) is a Hungarian football player who currently plays for Répcelaki SE. He has a younger brother, András, who currently plays for Győri ETO.

Honours  
Nemzeti Bajnokság I:  Runner-up: 2007 
Hungarian Second Division:  Winner: 2008

References 
HLSZ
UEFA

1988 births
Living people
People from Salgótarján
Hungarian footballers
Association football forwards
MTK Budapest FC players
Szombathelyi Haladás footballers
Soproni VSE players
Nyíregyháza Spartacus FC players
Sportspeople from Nógrád County